Akbar Tanjung (born 16 May 1993), is an Indonesian professional footballer who plays as a defensive midfielder for Liga 1 club PSM Makassar.

Club career

Badak Lampung
He was signed for Badak Lampung to play in Liga 1 in the 2019 season. Tanjung made his league debut on 18 May 2019 in a match against TIRA-Persikabo. On 12 December 2019, Tanjung scored his first goal for Badak Lampung against Bhayangkara in the 60th minute at the Sumpah Pemuda Stadium, Bandar Lampung.

PSIM Yogyakarta
In 2021, Akbar Tanjung signed a contract with Indonesian Liga 2 club PSIM Yogyakarta. He made his league debut on 26 September in a 1–0 loss against PSCS Cilacap at the Manahan Stadium, Surakarta.

PSM Makassar
Tanjung was signed for PSM Makassar to play in Liga 1 in the 2022–23 season. He made his league debut on 23 July 2022 in a match against PSS Sleman at the Maguwoharjo Stadium, Sleman.

Career statistics

Club

References

External links
 Akbar Tanjung at Soccerway
 Akbar Tanjung at Liga Indonesia

1993 births
Living people
Indonesian footballers
Liga 1 (Indonesia) players
Liga 2 (Indonesia) players
Cilegon United players
Badak Lampung F.C. players
PSIM Yogyakarta players
PSM Makassar players
Association football midfielders
People from Jakarta
Sportspeople from Jakarta